Robertino Coury is the American President and member of the Board of Directors of The Coury Firm and ÉO Management. He is also the Treasurer and member of the Board of Directors for The Robert J. Coury Family Foundation. As owner of Eleventh Records, and as a singer songwriter under the name Tino Coury he had a number of hits, with his song "Diary" charted on Top 40 radios and on Billboard Hot Dance Club Songs.

Business
The Coury Firm, founded in 1984 by Robert J. Coury, and headquartered in Pittsburgh, PA and with offices in Los Angeles, CA, works with prominent individuals, families and their family offices, businesses, and institutional clients to help them define, implement, and protect their financial and investment objectives. Robertino also serves as the Co-Chief Investment Officer of Coury Firm Asset Management LLC, where he focuses on designing and implementing algorithmic trading programs focused on macro investing and rooted in quantitative finance.

In addition to his role at Coury, Robertino serves as President and Chairman of the Investment Committee for ÉO Management. To fulfill the family’s objective of giving back, The Robert J. Coury Family Foundation was formed in 2014 where Robertino Coury serves on the Board of Directors. The foundation’s mission is to support efforts to expand the opportunity and educational experience for young, motivated, and passionate individuals around the world, aiding to enhance their knowledge base with guiding principles that can be applied to their professional careers.

Music
Prior to joining Coury, Robertino co-founded Eleventh Records, an independent music label, where as a producer and songwriter he launched a single in 2010 as Tino Coury. His follow-up was "Up Against The Wall" from EP Page One and "Drink My Love Away" from his 2012 debut album This One's For. Collaborations on the album included Da Internz, Sham & Motesart, Kadis & Sean and Mansur and songwriters Redd Stylez, Jackie Boyz, Lil Eddie, and Marlin "Hookman" Bonds.

Personal life
Robertino currently resides in Los Angeles, California, where he heads the firm’s West Coast Office.

Discography

Albums
2012: This One's For

EPs
2011: Page One EP

Singles

Music videos

In popular culture
"Diary" music was featured on soundtrack of the game Tap Tap Revenge 3.

References

External links
 TinoCoury.com — Official website, including lyrics and touring schedule

1988 births
Living people
21st-century American singers
American male singer-songwriters
American male pop singers
Musicians from Pittsburgh
Singer-songwriters from Pennsylvania
21st-century American male singers